Tamio (written: 民生 or 民夫) is a masculine Japanese given name. Notable people with the name include:

, Japanese writer
, Japanese actor
, Japanese voice actor
, Japanese singer-songwriter

Japanese masculine given names